Hans Frölicher (1887 - 1961) was the Swiss ambassador to Germany during World War II. He remains controversial in Switzerland due to his sympathies for the Third Reich while Ambassador in Berlin.

Ambassador to Germany

Frölicher replaced Paul Dinichert, who had served as Ambassador to Germany between 1932 and 1938. Frölicher was received by Adolf Hitler as Ambassador to Germany at a ceremony on June 9, 1938. Early in his tenure, Frölicher was able to delay relocating the Swiss Embassy, which had been required to fulfill Albert Speer's vision of Germania. Beginning in 1938, Frölicher was involved in negotiations between the governments of Germany and Switzerland aimed at reducing the number of Jews seeking refuge in Switzerland.

In 1939, a Swiss theology student named Maurice Bavaud attempted to assassinate Adolf Hitler. Although Bavaud was facing execution, Fröhlicher refused to intervene, going so far as to decline an offer to exchange Bavaud for captured Gestapo spies imprisoned in Switzerland.

Frölicher remained the Swiss Ambassador to Germany until 1945.

Post-ambassadorship

A memoir of his was privately published in 1962, entitled Meine Aufgabe in Berlin (My Task in Berlin).

Notes

References

1887 births
1961 deaths
Ambassadors of Switzerland to Germany
Knights Commander of the Order of Merit of the Federal Republic of Germany